The GNU Scientific Library (or GSL) is a software library for numerical computations in applied mathematics and science. The GSL is written in C; wrappers are available for other programming languages. The GSL is part of the GNU Project and is distributed under the GNU General Public License.

Project history 
The GSL project was initiated in 1996 by physicists Mark Galassi and James Theiler of Los Alamos National Laboratory. They aimed at writing a modern replacement for widely used but somewhat outdated Fortran libraries such as Netlib. They carried out the overall design and wrote early modules; with that ready they recruited other scientists to contribute.

The "overall development of the library and the design and implementation of the major modules" was carried out by Brian Gough and Gerard Jungman. Other major contributors were Jim Davies, Reid Priedhorsky, M. Booth, and F. Rossi.

Version 1.0 was released in 2001. In the following years, the library expanded only slowly; as the documentation stated, the maintainers were more interested in stability than in additional functionality. Major version 1 ended with release 1.16 of July 2013; this was the only public activity in the three years 2012–2014.

Vigorous development resumed with publication of version 2.0 in October 2015. The latest version 2.7 was released in June 2021.

Example 
The following example program calculates the value of the Bessel function of the first kind and order zero for 5:

#include <stdio.h>
#include <gsl/gsl_sf_bessel.h>

int main(void)
{
  double x = 5.0;
  double y = gsl_sf_bessel_J0(x);
  printf("J0(%g) = %.18e\n", x, y);
  return 0;
}
The example program has to be linked to the GSL library
upon compilation:
gcc $(gsl-config --cflags) example.c $(gsl-config --libs)

The output is shown below and should be correct to double-precision accuracy:
 J0(5) = -1.775967713143382920e-01

Features 
The software library provides facilities for:

Programming-language bindings 
Since the GSL is written in C, it is straightforward to provide wrappers for other programming languages. Such wrappers currently exist for
 AMPL
 C++
 Fortran
 Haskell
 Java
 Julia
 Common Lisp
 Ocaml
 Octave
 Perl Data Language
 Python
 R
 Ruby
  Rust

C++ support 
The GSL can be used in C++ classes, but not using pointers to member functions, because the type of pointer to member function is different from pointer to function. Instead, pointers to static functions have to be used. Another common workaround is using a functor.

C++ wrappers for GSL are available. Not all of these are regularly maintained. They do offer access to matrix and vector classes without having to use GSL's interface to malloc and free functions. Some also offer support for also creating workspaces that behave like Smart pointer classes. Finally, there is (limited, as of April 2020) support for allowing the user to create classes to represent a parameterised function as a functor.

While not strictly wrappers, there are some C++ classes  that allow C++ users to use the Gnu Scientific Library with wrapper features.

See also

 List of numerical-analysis software
 List of numerical libraries
 Netlib
 Numerical Recipes

Notes

References

External links
 
 GSL Design Document
 The gsl package for R (programming language),  an R wrapper for the special functions and quasi random number generators.
 FLOSS FOR SCIENCE interview with Mark Galassi on the history of GSL.

C (programming language) libraries
Free computer libraries
Free software programmed in C
Scientific Library
Mathematical libraries
Numerical libraries
Numerical software
Articles with example C code